Myth America: Historians Take On the Biggest Legends and Lies About Our Past is a book of essays by 20 leading historians and other academics debunking popular beliefs regarding events in American history, as well as more contemporary issues. The book was published by Basic Books in early 2023.

Edited by Kevin M. Kruse and Julian E. Zelizer, historians at Princeton University, the book focuses on more recent research challenging narratives promoted by conservative sources on subjects such as America's founding in the late 18th century, the South's rebellion during the 1860s, the New Deal of the 1930s, the Civil Rights Movement in the 1950s and 1960s, the Reagan "revolution" of the 1980s, and charges of voter fraud during the early 2020s. Its essays also cover a range of social and political issues, including immigration, feminism, capitalism, American socialism, and police violence.

Contents
Myth America opens with an introduction by the book's editors Kevin Kruse and Julian E. Zelizer and includes the following essays by recognized authorities on American history:
 American Exceptionalism — David A. Bell
 Founding Myths — Akhil Reed Amar
 Vanishing Indians — Ari Kelman
 Immigration — Erika Lee
 America First — Sarah Churchwell
 The United States Is an Empire — Daniel Immerwahr
 The Border — Geraldo Cadava
 American Socialism — Michael Kazin
 The Magic of the Marketplace — Naomi Oreskes and Erik M. Conway
 The New Deal — Eric Rauchway
 Confederate Monuments — Karen L. Cox
 The Southern Strategy — Kevin Kruse
 The Good Protest — Glenda Gilmore
 White Backlash — Lawrence B. Glickman
 The Great Society — Joshua Zeitz
 Police Violence — Elizabeth Hinton
 Insurrection — Kathleen Belew
 Family Values Feminism — Natalia Mehlman Petrzela
 Reagan Revolution — Julian E. Zelizer
 Voter Fraud — Carol Anderson

References

External link
"Was James Madison Truly Father of the Constitution?", Akhil Reed Amar, YouTube, 2022

2023 non-fiction books
21st-century history books
American history books
Basic Books books
Essay anthologies
History books about the United States